Bourbon King (foaled 1900) was an American Saddlebred stallion. He was known for being the founding sire of the popular Chief family of Saddlebreds.

Life
Bourbon King was foaled in 1900. He was a chestnut stallion with a star and white coronets on his hind feet. He was sired by Bourbon Chief and out of Annie C.
Bourbon King was bred and owned by Allie G. Jones, who had a farm near North Middletown, Kentucky. Jones was elected president of the American Saddle Horse Breeders' Association, the forerunner to the American Saddlebred Horse Association, in 1936.
Bourbon King lived to be 30 years old.

Career
Bourbon King was a five-gaited horse. He won the Grand Championship at the Louisville Horse Show at age three.

Offspring
Bourbon King was the progenitor of the Chief family, one of the most influential bloodlines in Saddlebreds. His son Edna May's King was the first horse to repeat win the Grand Championship at the Kentucky State Fair. One of Bourbon King's descendants, Wing Commander, was the first five-gaited horse to win six consecutive World Grand Championships.

References

Individual American Saddlebreds
1900 animal births
1930s animal deaths